John Henry Parrish (born November 26, 1977) is a former Major League Baseball relief pitcher who played for the Baltimore Orioles, Seattle Mariners, Toronto Blue Jays and Kansas City Royals.

High school years
Parrish attended McCaskey High School in Lancaster, Pennsylvania, and was a letterman in baseball, wrestling, and football. In baseball, he was an All-League selection as a pitcher/outfielder.

Professional career
Parrish was drafted by the Baltimore Orioles in the 26th round of the 1996 Major League Baseball Draft and made his major league debut for them in 2000. He missed the entire 2002 season with a knee injury and 2006 season recovering from Tommy John surgery. On August 9, 2007, he was traded to the Seattle Mariners for minor leaguer Sebastien Boucher and a player to be named later. He became a free agent at the end of the season. On January 2, 2008, he signed with the Toronto Blue Jays. In 17 games with Triple-A Syracuse, he went 10-1 with a 2.97 ERA and 100 strikeouts. On February 4, 2009, he signed a minor league contract with his original team, the Orioles, only to be released by the organization in April.

On January 4, 2010, Parrish signed a minor league contract with the Kansas City Royals with an invite to spring training.

On June 16, 2010, Parrish was released by the Royals.

References

External links

1977 births
Living people
American expatriate baseball players in Canada
Baltimore Orioles players
Baseball players from Pennsylvania
Bluefield Orioles players
Bowie Baysox players
Delmarva Shorebirds players
Frederick Keys players
Gulf Coast Orioles players
Kansas City Royals players
Lancaster Barnstormers players
Major League Baseball pitchers
Omaha Royals players
Rochester Red Wings players
Seattle Mariners players
Sportspeople from Lancaster, Pennsylvania
Syracuse Chiefs players
Tacoma Rainiers players
Toronto Blue Jays players